20th Century Masters – The Millennium Collection: The Best of Toby Keith is a compilation album of American country music artist Toby Keith's greatest hits. The album is part of a 20th Century Masters collection of similar albums. It features songs from his first four albums.

Track listing

Critical reception

20th Century Masters – The Millennium Collection: The Best of Toby Keith received four-and-a-half out of five stars from Stephen Thomas Erlewine of Allmusic. In his review, Erlewine praises the album as "a near-ideal summary of Keith's Mercury recordings as well as a fine introduction to the man himself."

Chart performance
20th Century Masters – The Millennium Collection: The Best of Toby Keith peaked at number 5 on the U.S. Billboard Top Country Albums chart. It also reached number 45 on the all-genre Billboard 200.

Weekly charts

Year-end charts

Sales and certifications
20th Century Masters – The Millennium Collection: The Best of Toby Keith was certified Gold by the RIAA in 2004 for shipments of 500,000 copies. As of August 2013, the album has sold 1,008,000 copies in the US.

References

Keith, Toby
Toby Keith compilation albums
2003 greatest hits albums
Mercury Records compilation albums
Albums produced by Harold Shedd
Albums produced by James Stroud